Pattan railway station is the station on Northern railway network zone of Indian Railways.

Location
The station is situated in Pattan in Baramulla district, Jammu and Kashmir.

History

The station has been built as part of the Jammu–Baramulla line megaproject, intending to link the Kashmir Valley with Jammu Tawi and the rest of the Indian railway network.

Design
Like the other railway stations in this megaproject, this station features Kashmiri wood architecture, with an intended ambience of a royal court which is designed to complement the local surroundings to the station. Station signage is predominantly in Urdu, English and Hindi.

Reduced level
The RL of the station is 1581 m above mean sea level.

See also
Baramulla railway station

References

Railway stations in Baramulla district
Railway stations opened in 2008
Firozpur railway division